The Janesville Transit System is the primary provider of mass transportation in Janesville, Wisconsin. Using twenty vehicles, six regular routes are provided from Monday through Saturday. Late evening service is also available using the Nightline route deviation service. Along with Beloit Transit, the agency operates an express route between the associated cities.

Routes
Day Services M-Fri (6:15am–6:15pm) Sat (8:45am-6:15)
Route 1: Milton Ave
Route 2: Kellogg Ave
Route 3: Wright Rd
Route 4: Court St
Route 5: Milwaukee St
Route 6: Beloit-Janesville Express (No Saturday Service)

Night Services M-F (6:15pm–10:15pm)
Nightside-Milton
Nightside-Southwest
Nightside-East
Special Routes are available during school days.
Buses runs every 30 minutes during the daytime besides Milwaukee St/Beloit-Janesville Express (Every Hour). Night service runs every hour.

Janesville Transfer Center

The Janesville Transfer Center at 123 South River Street was opened on May 18, 1998. It provides a central downtown location to transfer between routes, as well as with a daily intercity bus to Milwaukee.  There are 8 bus bays in total. Greyhound Lines formerly used the facility until 2004. The Transfer Center has comfortable benches, covered loading bays for all buses, a climate controlled waiting room, vending machines, a change machine, restroom facilities, and a pleasant view of the Rock River. The Transfer Center is staffed weekday evenings from 6-10PM. During this time customers may purchase fare materials, ask questions in person or by phone, or request a nightside deviation.

Beginning April 4, 2022 and lasting until late 2022, the facility will undergo renovations to improve accessibility, warmth and add amenities to the transit center with a $1.5 million federal grant. The project includes a new roof, extra set of sliding doors to make the waiting room warmer, updated HVAC and plumbing systems, new bathrooms and a bigger break room for bus drivers.

Ridership

See also
 Beloit Transit
 List of intercity bus stops in Wisconsin
 List of bus transit systems in the United States

References

External links
Janesville Transit System

Bus transportation in Wisconsin
Janesville, Wisconsin